Velsen is a municipality in the Netherlands, in the province of North Holland. It is located on both sides of the North Sea Canal.

On the north side of the North Sea Canal there is a major steel plant, Tata Steel IJmuiden, formerly known as Koninklijke Hoogovens (the town of IJmuiden is actually located south of the canal). The headquarters of the Koninklijke Nederlandse Redding Maatschappij is located in IJmuiden.

The Kennemerstrand beach on the south side of the canal is at the end of the Kennemerboulevard, which runs south of the Seaport Marina.

To the south is the beach of Bloemendaal aan Zee. In between is a nude beach.

Population centres 
The municipality of Velsen consists of the following cities, towns, villages and/or districts:
 on the north of the North Sea Canal:
 Velsen-Noord
 on the south of the North Sea Canal:
 Velsen-Zuid, Driehuis, IJmuiden, Santpoort-Noord, Santpoort-Zuid and Velserbroek, and the parts Oosterbroek and Buitenhuizen of the recreation area Spaarnwoude.

Dutch topographic map of the municipality of Velsen, June 2015

Transport 
In Velsen, there are the following connections across the North Sea Canal:
 A railway tunnel between the railway stations of Driehuis and Beverwijk.
 Road tunnels, from north to south:
 Wijker Tunnel
 Velser Tunnel next to the railway tunnel.
 A ferry
 A road across the lock complex
 Railway stations: Driehuis, Santpoort Noord, Santpoort Zuid

Also there used to be the Fast Flying Ferry to Amsterdam. There used to be a railway link between IJmuiden and Amsterdam, the IJmondlijn until 1999, when it was closed.

Local government 

The municipal council of Velsen consists of 33 seats, which are divided now (2022) as follows:
 VL - 7 seats
 D66V - 6 seats
 VVD - 4 seats
 GL - 3 seats
 PvdA - 3 seats
 LGV - 3 seats
 CDA - 2 seats
 Forza! IJmond - 2 seats
 Forum for Democracy - 2 seats
 CU - 1 seat

History
The ruins of a Roman naval base at Velsen discovered starting in 1945 are believed to be ancient Flevum, which is listed as Phleoum, Romanized to Phleum, in Ptolemy (2.10).

Twin towns
Velsen is twinned with

Notable people 

 Saint Engelmund of Velsen (died ca.739) an English-born missionary to Frisia
 Lieutenant Colonel Thomas Colclough Watson VC (1867 in Velsen – 1917) a recipient of the Victoria Cross
 Jan van der Hoeve (1878 in Santpoort – 1952) a Dutch ophthalmologist who described Waardenburg syndrome in 1916
 Karel Niessen (1895 in Velsen – 1967) a theoretical physicist, studied quantum mechanics
 Joop Doderer (1921 in Velsen – 2005) a Dutch actor who played Swiebertje 
 Annie Palmen (1926 in IJmuiden – 2000) a singer, participated in the 1963 Eurovision Song Contest
 Hans de Boer (born 1937 in Velsen) a retired Dutch politician and former minister
 Cornelis Vreeswijk (1937 in IJmuiden – 1987) a Swedish singer-songwriter, poet and actor 
 Pim Fortuyn (1948 in Driehuis – 2002) a controversial politician who was assassinated
 Jan Luiten van Zanden (born 1955 in IJmuiden) a Dutch economic historian and academic
 Peter Klashorst (born 1957 in Santpoort) a Dutch painter, sculptor and photographer
 Hans van de Ven (born 1958 in Velsen) an academic authority on the recent history of China
 Bernard Berkhout (born 1961 in Santpoort) a family doctor and a jazz clarinetist
 Franc Weerwind (born 1964) a Dutch politician, Mayor of Velsen 2009 to 2015
 Cees Krijnen (born 1969 in Velsen) a Dutch artist and a theatre actor
 Marie-José van der Kolk (born 1974 in IJmuiden), stage name Loona, a singer, songwriter and dancer
 Lenneke Ruiten (born 1984 in Velsen) a Dutch soprano

Sport 

 Adriaan de Groot (1914 in Santpoort – 2006) a Dutch chess master and psychologist
 Gerrit Voorting (1923 in Velsen – 2015) a Dutch road cyclist, silver medallist at the 1948 Summer Olympics
 Ilja Keizer (born 1944 in IJmuiden) a retired middle-distance runner, competed at the 1968 and 1972 Summer Olympics
 Piet Huyg (1951–2019) a Dutch footballer, 349 club caps with HFC Haarlem
 Eltjo Schutter (born 1953 in Driehuis) a retired Dutch decathlete and gynaecologist, competed at the 1976 Summer Olympics
 Olga Commandeur (born 1958 in Velsen) track and field athlete, competed in the 1984 Summer Olympics
 Ingrid Haringa (born 1964 in Velsen) a police officer, former speed skater and racing cyclist
 Stella de Heij (born 1968 in Driehuis) a former field hockey goalkeeper, team bronze medallist at the 1996 Summer Olympics
 René Bot (born 1978 in Velsen) a retired footballer with 262 club caps with De Graafschap
 Ronny van Es (born 1978 in Velsen) a Dutch retired footballer with 380 club caps
 Linda Bolder (born 1988 in Velserbroek) a Dutch-born Israeli Olympic judoka
 Joël Veltman (born 1992 in IJmuiden) a Dutch professional footballer with 160 caps with AFC Ajax 
and
 the Lords of Van Brederode, from the 12thC. to the 17thC., a noble family from Brederode Castle near Santpoort

Gallery

References

External links 

Official website

 
Municipalities of North Holland
Port cities and towns of the North Sea